Reptilisocia paraxena is a species of moth of the family Tortricidae. It is found in Indonesia (Sumatra).

References

Moths described in 1983
Tortricini
Moths of Indonesia